The Honens International Piano Competition is a triennial classical piano competition held in Calgary, Canada that awards prizes in piano performance. In addition to monetary awards, the top prize winner receives access to a career development program that includes concert engagements, a recording, management, and a Banff Centre residency. It is the world's wealthiest piano competition.

Founding 

In 1991, Esther Honens, a Canadian philanthropist, entrepreneur, and amateur pianist, created a $5 million endowment to host an international piano competition in her hometown of Calgary. She died shortly following the first competition in 1992.

Competition format 

Fifty quarterfinalists are chosen from a pool of applicants. Ten of these are chosen as semifinalists at rounds held in New York and Germany. These are then narrowed down to three finalists who complete for a monetary awards and a three-year career development program that includes artist management, international orchestral performances, production of professional recordings, and mentorship opportunities.

During the competition, contestants collaborate in performances with other musicians in chamber and vocal settings and concerto performances, in addition to playing self-programmed solo recitals, and participate in individual filmed interviews. Juries include representatives of music management and the recording industry as well as active concert pianists. Competitors are encouraged to showcase themselves and their own artistry.

The competition has been a member of the World Federation of International Music Competitions since 1998. Steinway & Sons is the official sponsor of the competition.

Festival 

Since 2014 the Competition has expanded to include a festival taking place in a variety of indoor and outdoor Calgary venues each year. The Honens Festival and Piano Competition earned a White Hat of the Year award from Tourism Calgary in 2015.

Laureates 

The Honens International Piano Competition named between three and five Laureates up to and including its 2009 competition. Starting in 2012, it switched to a sole Prize Laureate system.

1992
 Yi Wu, Argentina/China
 Krzysztof Jablonski, Poland
 Jean-Efflam Bavouzet, France
 Sergei Babayan, Armenia
 Dmitry Nesterov, Russia

1996
 Maxim Philippov, Russia
 Albert Tiu, Philippines
 Eugene Watanabe, United States

2000
 Katherine Chi, Canada
 Marko Martin, Estonia
 Alessandra Maria Ammara, Italy

2003
 Xiang Zou, China
 Winston Choi, Canada
 Roberto Plano, Italy

2006
 Minsoo Sohn, South Korea
 Hinrich Alpers, Germany
 Hong Xu, China

2009
 Georgy Tchaidze, Russia
 Evgeny Starodubtsev, Russia
 Gilles Vonsattel, Switzerland

2012
 Pavel Kolesnikov, Russia

2015
 Luca Buratto, Italy

2018
 Nicolas Namoradze, Georgia

2021
 The 2021 Honens International Piano Competition was postponed until 2022 because of the COVID-19 pandemic.

2022
 Illia Ovcharenko, Ukraine

References

External links
 Honens official competition website

Piano competitions